is the fourth most common Japanese surname.

People with the surname
, Japanese musician formerly known as Boku no Lyric no Bōyomi
, Japanese voice actress
, Japanese hurdler
, Japanese footballer
, Japanese women's footballer
, Japanese footballer
Atsuko Tanaka (disambiguation), multiple people
Ayumi Tanaka (born 1986), Japanese pianist and composer
, Japanese aikidoka
, Japanese model and actress
, Japanese Buddhist scholar and preacher
, Japanese speed skater
, Japanese playwright and dramatist
, Japanese merchant
, Japanese photographer
, Japanese botanist and mycologist
, Japanese baseball player
, Japanese basketball player
, Japanese footballer
Dean Tanaka, the birth name of Dean Cain (born 1966), American actor
, Japanese Nordic combined skier
, Japanese anime producer
, Japanese film director, screenwriter, and actor
Elly Tanaka (born 1965), biochemist
, Japanese actress and voice actress
Eugenia Tanaka (born 1987), Indonesian-born Australian badminton player
, Japanese statesman and educator
, Japanese rugby union player
, Japanese martial artist
Gary A. Tanaka (born 1943), Japanese-American businessman and philanthropist
, Japanese rugby union player
, Japanese general, politician, and Prime Minister of Japan
Haruko Tanaka, American artist and filmmaker
, Japanese actor
, Japanese footballer
, Japanese composer and arranger
, Japanese golfer
, Japanese novelist
Hideo Tanaka (disambiguation), multiple people
, Japanese footballer
, Japanese voice actor
, Japanese gymnast
, Japanese footballer
, Japanese composer and musician
, Japanese footballer
, Japanese decathlete
, Japanese video game developer, producer, director and designer
, Japanese high jumper
, Japanese field hockey player
, Japanese figure skater
, Japanese footballer
, Japanese baseball player
, Japanese general
Hisao Tanaka, also known as Martin Tanaka (died 1991), American professional wrestler
, Japanese rangaku scholar, engineer and inventor
, Japanese swimmer
, Japanese academic, art historian and curator
, Japanese graphic designer
, Japanese writer
, born Tanaka Jun (1908–1977), Japanese Nihonga painter
, Japanese field hockey player
Janice Tanaka, American artist
Janis Tanaka (born 1963), American musician
Jeffrey S. Tanaka (1958–1992), American psychologist and statistician
, Japanese mechanical engineer
, Japanese rower
Jun Tanaka (disambiguation), multiple people
, Japanese synchronized swimmer
, Japanese footballer
, Japanese footballer
, Japanese politician and Prime Minister of Japan
, Japanese voice actor
, oldest verified Japanese person ever
, Japanese composer
, Japanese drifting driver
, Japanese modern pentathlete
, Japanese gymnast
, Japanese baseball player
, Japanese footballer
, Japanese voice actor
, Japanese politician
Kazuo Tanaka, Japanese engineer
, Japanese actor
, Japanese figure skater
, Japanese politician
, Japanese footballer
, Japanese actor
, Japanese footballer
Kenichi Tanaka, Japanese mixed martial artist
, Japanese footballer
, Japanese baseball player
Kenneth K. Tanaka (born 1947), Japanese-born American Buddhist writer
, Japanese baseball player
, Japanese field hockey player
, Japanese actress and director
, Japanese swimmer
Kohei Tanaka (disambiguation), multiple people
, Japanese baseball player
, Japanese chemist
Koichi Tanaka (fighter) (born 1971), Japanese mixed martial artist
, Japanese footballer and manager
, Japanese photographer
, Japanese singer-songwriter, actor and idol
, Japanese videographer
, Japanese writer and translator
, Japanese boxer
Kōtarō Tanaka (disambiguation), multiple people
, Japanese rhythmic gymnast
, Japanese actor
, Japanese manga artist and character designer
Luana Tanaka (born 1989), Brazilian actress
, Japanese long-distance runner
 Japanese politician
, Japanese footballer
, Japanese voice actress
Marcio Tanaka (born 1980), Japanese-Brazilian baseball player
Marcus Tulio Tanaka (born 1981) Brazilian-born Japanese footballer
, Japanese tennis player
, Japanese writer
Masahiko Tanaka (disambiguation), multiple people
, Japanese baseball player
, Japanese footballer
Masako Tanaka, known as Mineko Iwasaki (born 1949), Japanese geisha
, Japanese swimmer
, Japanese manga artist
, Japanese professional wrestler
, Japanese singer
, Japanese voice actress
, Japanese manga artist
, Japanese singer and actress
, Japanese mixed martial artist
, Japanese badminton player
, Japanese model, television personality and actress
, Japanese judoka
, Japanese volleyball player and coach
, Japanese dancer and actor
, Japanese women's footballer
, Japanese luger
, Japanese voice actress
, Japanese announcer
, Japanese handball player
Minoru Tanaka (disambiguation), multiple people
, Japanese actress
, Japanese actress
, Japanese feminist and writer
, Japanese cyclist
, Japanese synchronized swimmer
, Japanese fencer
, Japanese footballer
Naoki Tanaka (disambiguation), multiple people
, Japanese film director
, Japanese field hockey player
, Japanese former Executive Director of the International Energy Agency
, Japanese footballer
, Japanese economic botanist
, Japanese aquatic botanist
, Japanese long-distance runner
Pat Tanaka (born 1961), American professional wrestler
Professor Tanaka (1930–2000), American professional wrestler
Paul Tanaka  American law enforcement officer and politician
, Japanese admiral
, Japanese singer
, Japanese actress and television personality
, Japanese singer and voice actress
, Japanese artistic gymnast
, Japanese footballer
, Japanese actress, television personality and singer
, Japanese writer and artist
Ronald Phillip Tanaka (1944–2007), Japanese-American poet and editor
, Japanese ice hockey player
Ryohei Tanaka (born 1933), Japanese artist
, Japanese voice actor
, Japanese voice actress
, Japanese politician
, Japanese general
, Japanese journalist
Sakuji Tanaka, Japanese businessman
Sara Tanaka (born 1978), American actress
, Japanese swimmer
, Japanese footballer
, Japanese baseball player
, Japanese taiko player
, Japanese boxing trainer
, Japanese rower
Shelley Tanaka, Canadian editor, author, translator, and writing teacher
, Japanese ichthyologist and professor of zoology
, Japanese long-distance runner
, Japanese badminton player
, Japanese judoka
, Japanese beach volleyball player
, Japanese samurai and assassin
Shingai Tanaka (born 1942), Japanese calligrapher
, Japanese ski jumper
, Japanese photographer
, Japanese footballer and manager
, Japanese general
, Japanese professional wrestler
, Japanese footballer
, Japanese physicist, music theorist, and inventor
, 17th-century Japanese merchant and explorer
, Japanese politician and conservationist
, Japanese footballer
, Japanese footballer
, Japanese baseball player
, Japanese footballer
, Japanese politician
, Japanese baseball player
, Japanese footballer
, Japanese footballer
, Japanese footballer
, Japanese voice actor
, Japanese figure skater
, Japanese screenwriter and playwright
Takashi Tanaka, a.k.a. Banjō Ginga (born 1948), Japanese voice actor
Takahiro Tanaka (disambiguation), multiple people
, Japanese voice actress
, Japanese biathlete
Tatsuya Tanaka (disambiguation), multiple people
, Japanese motorcycle racer
, Japanese footballer
, Japanese footballer
, Japanese anti-nuclear and anti-war activist
, Japanese Paralympic athlete
, Japanese actor
Tetsuya Tanaka (disambiguation), multiple people
Togo Tanaka (1916–2009), American journalist and newspaper editor
, Japanese photographer
, Japanese film director
Tommy Tanaka, Guam politician
Tomohiro Tanaka (disambiguation), multiple people
, Japanese ice dancer
, Japanese long-distance runner
, Japanese film producer
, Japanese shogi player
, Japanese samurai
, Japanese table tennis player
, Japanese politician
, Japanese composer
Toshiya Tanaka (disambiguation), multiple people
, Japanese equestrian
, Japanese diplomat
, Japanese politician
, Japanese baseball player
, Japanese footballer
Yasuhiro Tanaka (disambiguation), multiple people
, Japanese footballer
Yasuo Tanaka (disambiguation), multiple people
, Japanese artist
, Japanese ice hockey player
, Japanese actor
, Japanese women's footballer
, Japanese businessman
, Japanese novelist
, Japanese actress
, Japanese table tennis player
, Japanese civil servant and naturalist
, Japanese swimmer
, Japanese footballer
, Japanese footballer
, Japanese shogi player
, Japanese comedian
Yuka Tanaka (born 1974), Japanese tennis player
Yuki Tanaka (disambiguation), multiple people
, Japanese swimmer
Yukio Tanaka (disambiguation), multiple people
, Japanese actress
, Japanese biathlete
Yūsuke Tanaka (disambiguation), multiple people

Fictional characters
Lady Tanaka, is the main antagonist in the movie "The Punisher"(1989) 
Tanaka, a character in the manga series Black Butler
Tanaka, the household servant in Full Moon o Sagashite
Tanaka, the Usami household butler in Junjo Romantica
Tanaka, from Kimi ni Todoke
Tanaka, a character in the light novel series Mayoi Neko Overrun
Tanaka, from Tanaka-kun is Always Listless
Mr. Tanaka, from F-Zero GX
Mr. Tanaka, from Sonic X
Mr. Tanaka, from the anime Gantz
President Tanaka, from Persona 3
Aiko Tanaka from Oyasumi Punpun
Asuka Tanaka, from Sound! Euphonium
David Tanaka, a character in the soap opera Neighbours
Drew Tanaka from The Heroes of Olympus and The Kane Chronicles
Gundham Tanaka from Danganronpa 2: Goodbye Despair
Holly Tanaka, a character in the video Game Halo 5: Guardians
Ichiro Tanaka, character from Medal of Honor: Rising Sun
Isuro Tanaka, from the film Major League II
Tanaka Kazuya, from School Rumble
Ken Tanaka, a character in the television series Glee
Leo Tanaka, a character in the soap opera Neighbours
Mariko Tanaka, from Wing Commander
Opal Tanaka, a Marvel Comics character
Ryūnosuke Tanaka from Haikyū!!
Shinichiro Tanaka, from Battle Royale (film, Special Edition)
Shinji Tanaka, from Yakuza (video game)
Souichirou Tanaka, character from Genshiken
Taro Tanaka, from Taro the Space Alien (Uchūjin Tanaka Tarō)
Tiger Tanaka, from the James Bond novel and film You Only Live Twice
Tom Tanaka, from Durarara!
Lt. Yoshi Tanaka from Magnum, P.I.
Yukio "Koyuki" Tanaka, main character of the manga series BECK
Tricia Tanaka, featured in the episode Tricia Tanaka is Dead from the TV show Lost (tv series)

See also
, Japanese gymnast
Kumiko Tanaka-Ishii (born 1969), Japanese linguist
, Japanese mathematician

References

Japanese-language surnames